Stephen Nagbe Mennoh (born June 5, 1984 in Monrovia) is a Liberian footballer who plays for Persiraja Banda Aceh. He has also played for the Liberia national football team.

References

External links 
 
 
 
 

1984 births
Living people
Liberian footballers
Liberia international footballers
Association football midfielders
Expatriate footballers in Indonesia
Sportspeople from Monrovia